Kakkarissi Natakam is a folk art form of Kerala state, India, originally from Tamil Nadu. This art form is more popular in the southern regions of Kerala. It is a form of musical drama and the language used is a blend of Tamil and Malayalam. Sundara Kakkan, Kakkathis, Vedan, Thampuraan, etc. are the main characters in this art form. Play is performed with dance steps and songs. Mrudangam, Harmonium, Ganchira, Chenda and Kaimani are the main musical instruments used. The story is premised around Lord Shivan with his consort Parvathi Devi who arrived to earth in the form of Kakkalan and Kakkathi, a nomadic tribe of fortune tellers.

Gallery

References 

Culture of Kerala
Arts of Kerala